Acton Memorial Library is a public library at 486 Main Street in Acton, Massachusetts. In 1889 William Allan Wilde (1827-1902), a Sunday school publisher and philanthropist who was a native of Acton, donated funds to construct the library to memorialize Acton's citizens who served in the American Civil War. The historic Romanesque Revival library building was constructed in 1890 by the architects Hartwell and Richardson of Boston and contractor, Charles H. Dodge. Large additions were constructed in 1967 and 1996. The library is part of the Minuteman Library Network. It is contributing property in the Acton Centre Historic District.

References

External links
Official website

Public libraries in Massachusetts
Libraries in Middlesex County, Massachusetts